The Columbia South Carolina Temple is the 62nd operating temple of the Church of Jesus Christ of Latter-day Saints (LDS Church).

The temple is located in Hopkins, South Carolina because of its central location within the state. The building is set in a residential neighborhood and surrounded by native loblolly pine and oak trees. The grounds are landscaped with the area's natural flora including myrtle, holly, mums, and dogwood trees. The exterior of the temple is gray granite and features art glass windows. The temple has the traditional lone spire topped by a gold-plated angel Moroni.

History 
A groundbreaking ceremony for the Columbia South Carolina Temple was held on December 5, 1998. Before its dedication, about 20,000 people toured the temple during an open house. The temple was dedicated the October 15–16, 1999 by LDS Church president Gordon B. Hinckley.

In 2020, the Columbia South Carolina Temple was closed in response to the coronavirus pandemic.

Gallery

See also

 Comparison of temples of The Church of Jesus Christ of Latter-day Saints
 List of temples of The Church of Jesus Christ of Latter-day Saints
 List of temples of The Church of Jesus Christ of Latter-day Saints by geographic region
 Temple architecture (Latter-day Saints)
 The Church of Jesus Christ of Latter-day Saints in South Carolina

References

Additional reading

External links
 
Columbia South Carolina Temple Official site
Columbia South Carolina Temple at ChurchofJesusChristTemples.org

20th-century Latter Day Saint temples
Buildings and structures in Columbia, South Carolina
Latter Day Saint movement in South Carolina
Temples (LDS Church) completed in 1999
Temples (LDS Church) in the United States
Religious buildings and structures in South Carolina
1999 establishments in South Carolina